Moisés Barack (born December 26, 1943) is a Peruvian former footballer and international football manager. Barack, born in Ica, Peru, was the head manager of the Peru national football team from 1984 to 1985, and is currently the head manager of Deportivo Garcilaso in Cuzco, Peru.

Career 

Barack has been the coach of many club teams, each of which won at least one major football tournament. He started out as a player at Iqueño Center in 1959, and then went on to coach several clubs.

List of clubs coached:

 Sipesa of Chimbote
 Union Huaral
 Sport Boys
 Atlético Chalaco

Thereafter, Barack was part of the Peru National Board of Coaches.

References 
 http://api.elcomercio.pe/moisesbarackg
 http://www.sonico.com/u/5537828/Moises_Barack
 http://elcomercio.pe/ediciononline/HTML/2007-11-08/moises_barack_es_el_nuevo_entr.html

Living people
Peruvian footballers
Peruvian football managers
1943 births
Association football defenders
Deportivo Garcilaso managers